Debbie Thrower (born 17 November 1957 in Nairobi, Kenya) is an English journalist and broadcaster who presented BBC national news bulletins in the 1980s and ITV Meridian's flagship news programme Meridian Tonight (southern edition) from its inception in 1993 to 2009. She is the founder and pioneer of Anna Chaplaincy for Older People, part of The Bible Reading Fellowship, BRF.

Early life and education
She was born in Nairobi, the capital of Kenya, and spent her early childhood there before she and her family came back to England, settling in Devon. She was educated at Edgehill College, formerly a girls' independent school in Bideford, Devon, and the University of London where she obtained a degree in French.

Career

Journalism
Thrower originally trained as a newspaper journalist at the Wimbledon Guardian.  She began her broadcasting career at BBC Radio Leicester, before moving to BBC Radio Solent in the early 1980s, and then transferring to television as the co-presenter of BBC South Today.  In 1987, she replaced Jan Leeming reading national BBC news bulletins, primarily at weekends and then read the Nine O’Clock News for a time.  She also became a regular presenter on Songs of Praise, and the Sunday programme on BBC Radio 4.

Radio and television
Transferring to ITV, Thrower and colleague Fred Dinenage were presenters of Meridian Tonight (South) when it first aired in 1993. In addition, she was the first person seen after the changeover of TV contractor from TVS to Meridian, shortly after the stroke of midnight on New Year's Day 1993, covering the celebrations at Winchester Cathedral, which was celebrating its 900th anniversary. Her final show as presenter of Meridian Tonight was on 6 February 2009.

She was latterly the final presenter for Channel 4's popular antiques programme Collectors' Lot, which aired on weekday afternoons, gaining two million viewers a day.

She also had a BBC Radio 2 afternoon show between 1995 and 1998 replacing long-time presenter Gloria Hunniford. On 13 January 2009, Thrower confirmed in an interview with The News in Portsmouth that she was leaving ITV Meridian to concentrate on freelance work and her voluntary ministry as a Church of England reader or Licensed Lay Minister (LLM). Thrower is a Canon Emeritus of Winchester Cathedral. In 2016 she was awarded an honorary degree for public service from the University of Winchester- Doctor of Letters honoris causa.

Religious and charity work

In November 2009 she was appointed the first Chaplain to Older People in Alton, Hampshire. She went on to pioneer Anna Chaplaincy to Older People (named after the elderly widow Anna in St Luke's gospel, a good role model of a faithful older person) which started in Alton, the result of a covenant-signing between Anglicans and Methodists to collaborate more closely. The Anna Chaplaincy approach to supporting people in care homes and the wider community, meeting the spiritual needs of men and women in their later years whether they have a strong faith or none, is spreading nationally through The Bible Reading Fellowship, BRF. The Abingdon-based charity is helping to develop Anna Chaplaincy for older people of which Thrower is founder and pioneer. There is now a network of more than 160 Anna Chaplains and others in equivalent roles across the UK.

References

External links 

 

1957 births
Living people
English television journalists
English women journalists
ITN newsreaders and journalists
ITV regional newsreaders and journalists
British television newsreaders and news presenters
British radio journalists
British women radio journalists
British women television journalists
Kenyan people of English descent
People from Nairobi
Television personalities from Devon
BBC Radio 2 presenters
British women radio presenters